The Type 07P is a Chinese infantry fighting vehicle manufactured by Poly Technologies.

Variants 
 Standard version
 Command post vehicle
 Recovery vehicle
 YLGA01 internal security vehicle
 Type 07PA self-propelled howitzer, also designated CS/SM2, (using the turret of the PLL-05)

Service 
Twenty Type 07P, including one command and one recovery vehicle, have been delivered to Cameroon. In service with Cameroon Armed Forces Armoured Reconnaissance Battalion (Bataillon Blindé de Reconnaissance), they have seen combat during Boko Haram insurgency. One of them destroyed a Boko Haram Saurer 4K 4FA.

The Type 07PA is in service with Tanzania. Twelve guns were delivered in 2014.

See also 
 Type 08

References 

Armoured fighting vehicles of the People's Republic of China
Wheeled armoured fighting vehicles
Eight-wheeled vehicles
Wheeled infantry fighting vehicles